OIS (Object-Oriented Input System) is a code library for constructing a human-computer interface with input devices such as a keyboard, mouse or game controller. OIS is designed so that software developers can easily use input from these devices with a computer application.

General information
The Object-Oriented Input Library is a mostly C++ library for handling input. Input types include mouse, keyboard, joystick and Wii remote.

OIS is meant to be cross-platform, supporting Windows and Linux systems. OS X and FreeBSD are only partially supported.

Features
OIS uses an Object-oriented design.

Various types of input including mouse, keyboard, joystick and Wii Remote are supported.

OIS can handle force feedback devices.

References

External links
 Project Homepage
 Project Repository (GitHub)
 Source-Forge project page (legacy)
 Ohloh project page

Free software programmed in C++